This is a sub-article to Białystok

Over the centuries Białystok has produced a number of persons who have provided unique contributions to the fields of science, language, politics, religion, sports, visual arts and performing arts. This environment was created in the mid 18th century by the patronage of Jan Klemens Branicki for the arts and sciences. A list of recent notable persons includes, but is not limited to:
 Ryszard Kaczorowski, last émigré President of the Republic of Poland 
 L. L. Zamenhof, the creator of Esperanto
 Albert Sabin, co-developer of the polio vaccine
 Izabella Scorupco, actress 
 Max Weber, painter.

 Fictional 

 Max Białystok of The Producers (1968 film)

 Birthplace 

 Tomasz Bagiński, Polish illustrator, animator and director, (The Cathedral)
 Batushka, black metal band
 Sala Burton (née Galante), United States Representative from California
 Marek Citko, Polish former footballer
 Aleksandra Ekster, painter and designer
 Tomasz Frankowski, Polish footballer
 Hermann Friedmann, philosopher
 Mariusz Gogol, former professional footballer
 Fabio Grobart, Cuban revolutionary and mentor of Fidel Castro
 Małgorzata Guzowska, Polish heptathlete
 Ryszard Kaczorowski, last émigré President of the Republic of Poland
 Shlomo Kaplansky (1884-1950), Israeli politician and President of the Technion – Israel Institute of Technology
 Bartosz Kaśnikowski, Polish footballer
 Boris Kaufman, cinematographer
 Mikhail Kaufman, cinematographer and photographer
 Ewa Kracowska, a Jewish holocaust survivor who fought in the Jewish resistance movement during World War II
 Ernst Krenkel, Arctic explorer
 Jarosław Kazberuk, Polish rally driver
 Wojciech Kowalewski, Poland national team goalkeeper
 Rufus Learsi, American educator and author
 Abraham ben Eliezer Lipman Lichtstein, rabbi, author and Talmudic scholar
 Maxim Litvinov, Russian revolutionary and prominent Soviet diplomat
 Natalia Maliszewska, short track speed skater
 Marika, singer and songwriter
 Jacek Markiewicz, Polish football player
 Wojciech Nowicki, hammer thrower, Olympic medallist
 Yakov Perelman, Soviet popular science writer
 Mariusz Piekarski, Polish football player
 Samuel Pisar, lawyer and writer
 Albert Sabin, co-developer of the polio vaccine; President of the Weizmann Institute of Science
 Izabella Scorupco, actress
 Khayele Grober, theatre actor and playwright
 Adam Rayski, French Resistance leader. 
 Simon Segal, painter
 Radosław Sobolewski, Polish football player
 Mischa Spoliansky, composer
 Eleazar Sukenik, archaeologist
 Aneta Todorczuk-Perchuć, Polish actress and vocalist.
 George Trilling, president of the American Physical Society
 Łukasz Tupalski, Polish football player
 Marek Twardowski, Polish sprint canoer
 Robert Tyszkiewicz, Polish politician
 Ephraim Urbach, Talmud scholar and recipient of the Israel Prize
 Marek Wasiluk, Polish football player
 Max Weber, painter
 Lucyna Wlazło-Bajewska Krzywonos, Polish glider pilot and gliding instructor.
 Dziga Vertov (Kaufman), a Soviet documentary film and newsreel director
 Dariusz Zakrzewski, Polish professional road racing cyclist
 L. L. Zamenhof, the creator of Esperanto
 Hans Ziglarski, German boxer
 Mirosław Złotkowski, Polish Greco-Roman wrestler

 Inhabitants 
 Michał Kulesza, painter.
 Paweł Małaszyński, Polish TV and film actor.

During the 2006 mayoral elections, a humorous and peculiar TV spot of one of the candidates, Krzysztof Kononowicz of the electoral committee Podlaskie of the 21st Century'', attracted some notoriety for his purposely unsophisticated political advertisement, first aired on local TV and featured heavily on YouTube. Within several days, over 3 million Internet users had seen the commercial on YouTube, posted by Kononowicz's electoral committee, with additional exposure on Polish national TV.

References

 
Białystok